Tovia Opeloge (born ) is a Samoan male weightlifter, competing in the 105 kg category and representing Samoa at international competitions. He won the gold medal at the 2013 Pacific Mini Games. He participated at the 2010 Commonwealth Games in the 105 kg event and at the 2014 Commonwealth Games.

Major competitions

References

1990 births
Living people
Samoan male weightlifters
Weightlifters at the 2010 Commonwealth Games
Weightlifters at the 2014 Commonwealth Games
Commonwealth Games competitors for Samoa
Place of birth missing (living people)